Travel time may refer to

 Travel, movement of people between locations
 Travel journal, record made by a voyager
 Propagation delay, the time taken for an electrical signal or a certain number of bytes to be transferred
 Time of arrival, time for a radio signal to travel from transmitter to receiver
 Time-of-flight, time for a particle to travel through a medium
  Interaural time difference, difference in time that it takes a sound to travel between two ears
 Travel behavior, how people use transport
 Walking distance measure, distance that can be travelled in a certain amount of time
 Travel Time, a Philippine television program
 Travel Time, (in Seismology) time for the seismic waves to travel from the focus of an earthquake through the crust to a certain seismograph station → Travel-time curve

See also 
 Time in physics